Sonic Blast Man II is a video game developed and published by Taito for the Super Nintendo Entertainment System in 1994.

Gameplay
Sonic Blast Man II is a sequel to the arcade game Sonic Blast Man. The gameplay is similarly to its predecessor and adds more options, new playable characters "Sonia" and "Captain Choyear," and two-player modes.

Reception

Next Generation reviewed the game, rating it two stars out of five, and stated that "it's not a rotten game, but there's nothing here to make you sit up and take notice". Electronic Gaming Monthly gave the game positive reviews stating that "if you liked the first Blast Man, then you will definitely enjoy this second round".

Reviews
Electronic Gaming Monthly (Dec, 1994)
GamePro (Jan, 1995)

Notes

References

1994 video games
Side-scrolling video games
Super Nintendo Entertainment System games
Super Nintendo Entertainment System-only games
Taito beat 'em ups
Video games developed in Japan